Martinborough ( or ) is a town in the South Wairarapa District, in the Wellington region of New Zealand. It is 65 kilometres east of Wellington and 35 kilometres south-west of Masterton. The town has a resident population of 

The town is home to the South Wairarapa District Council.

History and culture

European settlement

John Martin is regarded as the town’s founder and set out the first streets in the pattern of the Union Flag in the 19th century. Before Martinborough was established the southern part of the region was known as Waihenga, a point that seems to be lost at times in the history of the district. A feature is the colonial architecture, one example of which is the historic Martinborough Hotel, built in 1882.

Prior to the expansion of viticulture, Martinborough was largely a rural service town for nearby farms.

Marae

The local Hau Ariki Marae and Te Whare Wananga o Tupai meeting house are affiliated with the Ngāti Kahungunu hapū of Ngāti Hikawera o Kahungunu.

In October 2020, the Government committed $371,332 from the Provincial Growth Fund to upgrade the marae, and create 37 jobs.

Demographics 

Martinborough had a population of 1,767 at the 2018 New Zealand census, an increase of 294 people (20.0%) since the 2013 census, and an increase of 438 people (33.0%) since the 2006 census. There were 741 households. There were 852 males and 915 females, giving a sex ratio of 0.93 males per female. The median age was 49.3 years (compared with 37.4 years nationally), with 288 people (16.3%) aged under 15 years, 192 (10.9%) aged 15 to 29, 840 (47.5%) aged 30 to 64, and 444 (25.1%) aged 65 or older.

Ethnicities were 84.9% European/Pākehā, 18.5% Māori, 3.6% Pacific peoples, 3.7% Asian, and 1.9% other ethnicities (totals add to more than 100% since people could identify with multiple ethnicities).

The proportion of people born overseas was 19.5%, compared with 27.1% nationally.

Although some people objected to giving their religion, 57.0% had no religion, 31.4% were Christian, 0.3% were Hindu, 0.2% were Muslim, 1.9% were Buddhist and 3.4% had other religions.

Of those at least 15 years old, 387 (26.2%) people had a bachelor or higher degree, and 279 (18.9%) people had no formal qualifications. The median income was $33,200, compared with $31,800 nationally. The employment status of those at least 15 was that 723 (48.9%) people were employed full-time, 246 (16.6%) were part-time, and 30 (2.0%) were unemployed.

Economy

Martinborough has a large number of vineyards producing wines, notably Pinot noir. Martinborough has a warm micro-climate, with hills to the east and west. Almost all the vineyards are in thin ribbons around the northern and eastern sides of the town, and on the Dry River to the south. All follow dry riverbeds, which provide appropriate soils for viticulture.

Notable wineries include Schubert Wines, Te Kairanga, Tirohana Estate, Palliser Estate Wines, Dry River, Martinborough Vineyard, Murdoch James, Ata Rangi, Craggy Range, and Escarpment. During November, the region's wines are celebrated in the Toast Martinborough wine festival. This event temporarily enlarges the population by 10,000.

Other industries around Martinborough focus on traditional beef and sheep farming; growing olives, lavender and nuts; and fishing at the coast settlements of Ngawi and Cape Palliser. Tourism is an important industry for the town, and the Martinborough i-site provides advice about accommodation, activities, wineries and where to eat. Several wineries and specialist tour operators offer vineyard tours, and the Martinborough Brewery is also located in town.

Education

The nearest high school is Kuranui College.

The international cooking school Le Cordon Bleu and UCOL considered establishing a campus in Martinborough by 2009. They eventually opted to open a campus in Wellington instead, disappointing locals who were hoping it would provide an economic boost to the town.

Notable residents
 John Martin - politician, runholder, and founder of Martinborough
 Eric Ramsden - journalist and author

References

External links 
 www.martinborough.com
 Destination Wairarapa regional tourism website for visitors
 www.martinboroughnz.com Martinborough Business Association website

 
Populated places in the Wellington Region
South Wairarapa District
Wine regions of New Zealand